Lypothora roseochraon is a species of moth of the family Tortricidae. It is found in Ecuador.

The wingspan is about 28 mm. The ground colour of the forewings is white, preserved in the dorsal half of the wing from the base to the tornal area. The forewings are marked by some brown scales and a postmedian dot. The hindwings are brownish.

Etymology
The species name is derived from Greek roseos (meaning pinkish) and chrao (meaning slightly wounded).

References

Moths described in 2010
Polyorthini